"I'm Gonna Get You" is a song by English electronic music group Bizarre Inc, featuring collaborative lead vocals by English singer Angie Brown. It was released in September 1992 as the second single from the group's second studio album, Energique (1992). It contains lyrics from the Jocelyn Brown song "Love's Gonna Get You", and a sample from "Brass Disk" by Dupree. "I'm Gonna Get You" proved to be a hit on the UK Singles Chart in October 1992, peaking at number three and later being certified silver by the British Phonographic Industry for sales in excess of 200,000 copies, and it also reached the number-three position in the Netherlands in January 1993. The track failed to reach the top 40 on the US Billboard Hot 100, but did top the Billboard Hot Dance Club Songs chart as well as the Canadian RPM Dance/Urban chart.

Background
English singer and songwriter Angie Brown was introduced to Bizarre Inc through her agent and was asked to do some session work with them. The group asked her to sing like Jocelyn Brown, and instead of using a very expensive sample from Jocelyn Brown's song they wanted Angie Brown to re-sing the song. She nailed it in about 20 minutes, but didn't expect the song to perform so well from a commercial perspective. At that time house music was a new territory to her. 3 months later the song was a massive hit and was played everywhere.

Chart performance
"I'm Gonna Get You" was a major hit on the charts on several continents. It made it to number-one on both the RPM Dance/Urban chart in Canada and the Billboard Dance Club Songs chart in the United States. In Europe, it entered the top 10 in the Netherlands (3) and the United Kingdom. In the latter, the single peaked at number three in its fourth week at the UK Singles Chart, on October 18, 1992. It was held off reaching number-one by Boyz II Men's "End of the Road" and Tasmin Archer's "Sleeping Satellite". On the European Dance Radio Chart, it reached number seven. Additionally, the song was a top 20 hit in Belgium (14) and Ireland (17), as well as on the Eurochart Hot 100, where it peaked at number 19. Outside Europe, "I'm Gonna Get You" also peaked at number 47 on the Billboard Hot 100 in the US and number 158 in Australia. It was awarded with a silver record in the UK, after 200,000 singles were sold there.

Critical reception
Ned Raggett of AllMusic complimented the song a "noted smash, with great diva vocals from Angie Brown (one of her earliest star turns) and a simple but still sweeping string section reminiscent of disco's orchestrations at their best". Larry Flick from Billboard wrote, "Fabrication of Jocelyn Brown's dance nugget "Love's Gonna Get You" is steeped in rave sensibilities without sacrificing commercial appeal. Added potential comes via Angie Brown, who gives the U.K. act a marketable face. Maddeningly catchy chorus will likely spark a successful foray into the top 40." Marisa Fox from Entertainment Weekly noted that the trio "layers bass-heavy rhythms under warm disco choruses, making butt-burning dance music, not teen-bleep techno." She concluded that "Giorgio Moroder would surely be proud." 

James Hamilton from Music Week'''s RM Dance Update found that the Stafford based trio "go back to the classic 1979/81 disco sound for this soulful [track]". Mandi James from NME wrote, "Bizarre Inc have hit the jackpot yet again with the schoolgirl crush of 'I'm Gonna Get You'. Camp as you like, 'I'm Gonna Get You' tickles and teases with flirtatious vocals proving that Bizarre Inc are at their very best when they follow their gut instincts and head blatantly for the mainstream rather than darting around on the underground." Rupert Howe from Select stated that "the evergreen sound of the New York underground has captured the Bizarre imagination. The raw, fingers-down-a-blackboard racket of ravecore has been replaced by the finger-snapping swing of NY giant Todd Terry with new tracks like the garage style 'I'm Gonna Get You'." Josh Baines from Vice complimented the song as "great".

Live performances
Top of the Pops and The Voice UK
"I'm Gonna Get You" was performed on Top of the Pops in 1992. In 2014, Brown sung the song in an audition for The Voice UK. Though it brought many audience members to their feet, none of the judges turned around even though will.i.am noted that the song had inspired part of the Black Eyed Peas track "Boom Boom Pow". He said it was "one of [his] favourite songs and [he] never thought [he] would get to meet the person who sung it". He elaborated:

The fact that Brown had not been selected made the audience and TV viewers furious, with one viewer branding it a "disgrace".

Britney Spears also performed a cover version of the song during her time on the Mickey Mouse Club.

Music video
A music video was produced to promote the single. It was later published on YouTube in August 2013. By December 2022, the video had more than 5,9 million views.

Impact and legacyPitchfork included "I'm Gonna Get You" in their list of "Ten Actually Good 90s Jock Jams" in 2010.Porcys listed the song at number 75 in their ranking of "100 Singles 1990-1999" in 2012, adding, "Well, why do I think it's such a good job? Firstly, the level of energy produced for over five minutes does not settle down even for a second. Secondly, samples straight from Joselyn Brown are used in a thoughtful and extremely catchy way. Thirdly, Angie Brown's vocals cause chills around the third cervical vertebra. It is more than a confession, it is a musical expression of female stubbornness and an offer that cannot be rejected."Fact put "I'm Gonna Get You" at number-one in their list of "21 Diva-House Belters That Still Sound Incredible" in 2014.BuzzFeed listed the song at number 20 in their list of "The 101 Greatest Dance Songs Of the '90s" in 2017.Mixmag'' ranked it as one of the 30 best songs in their "The 30 Best Vocal House Anthems Ever" list in 2018, noting, "With its call and response lyrics, electrifying piano line and shining rave sensibilities, this one's still a certified banger! It hits like a shot of liquid serotonin in the dance, with the assertive tone of Brown’s vocals grabbing dancefloors by the scruff of the neck and thrusting them into overdrive." And in 2019, "I'm Gonna Get You" was included in their ranking of "The 20 Best Diva House Tracks".

Track listing

Charts and certifications

Weekly charts

Year-end charts

Certifications

Dave Audé version
Dave Audé interpolated the song in 2015, writing and adding new verses. With vocals by Jessica Sutta, Audé's version charted at number one on the US Hot Dance Club Songs.

See also
 List of number-one dance singles of 1993 (U.S.)
 List of number-one dance singles of 1993 (Canada)
 List of number-one dance singles of 2015 (U.S.)

References

1992 songs
1992 singles
2015 singles
Bizarre Inc songs
Music Week number-one dance singles